Bonnie McKinnon is a Canadian businesswoman and politician in British Columbia, Canada. She represented Surrey-Cloverdale in the Legislative Assembly of British Columbia from 1996 to 2001 as a Liberal and then Independent member.

For her initial provincial election in 1996, she recruited family friend (and future mayor) Dianne Watts as a campaign organizer which helped launch Watts into city council.

McKinnon left the Liberal party while in office due to disagreement with leader Gordon Campbell and dissatisfaction with support for women MLAs.  She was defeated by Kevin Falcon when she ran for reelection in 2001 as an Independent.

Prior to provincial politics, McKinnon served as a member of Surrey City Council. She was president of the Cloverdale Skating Club and of the Surrey Board of Trade and a director for the Cloverdale Rodeo and Exhibition Association.

References 

Year of birth missing (living people)
Living people
British Columbia Liberal Party MLAs
Businesspeople from British Columbia
Canadian women in business
Surrey, British Columbia city councillors
Women MLAs in British Columbia
Women municipal councillors in Canada
20th-century Canadian politicians
20th-century Canadian women politicians